Jack William Woolgar (15 September 1913 – 14 July 1978) was a British character actor working in television and film in the 1960s and 1970s. He began acting towards the end of the Second World War and turned professional shortly afterwards, working in repertory theatre and touring the UK. He acted on live TV in Granada during the 1950s, whilst at the Theatre Royal, Huddersfield.

Woolgar was often cast as dirty old tramps, such as The Avengers episode "The Living Dead" - he had lifelong chest problems and he was able to produce a bubbling hacking cough at will. Prominent roles include the coal miner father in Stand Up, Nigel Barton, an autobiographical play by Dennis Potter, and Sam Carne 'Carney' in the soap opera Crossroads. He also played Professor Kirke in the 1967 serial of The Lion, the Witch and the Wardrobe, as well as Professor Branestawm in the 1969 series The Incredibale Adventures of Professor Branestawm. Other appearances include roles in Please Sir (The Generation Gap), The Onedin Line (The Hostage/Survivor), The Sweeney (Jigsaw) and Doctor Who (The Web of Fear).

He was married to the RADA trained actress Elizabeth Mann (13 July 1920 – 18 February 1980) and had four children.

Partial filmography
The Spy with a Cold Nose (1966) - Zookeeper (uncredited)
Hammerhead (1968) - Tookey Tate
Where's Jack? (1969) - Mr. Woods
Say Hello to Yesterday (1971) - Boy's father (uncredited)
The Raging Moon (1971) - Bruce's Father
The Snow Goose (1972) - Pinnace Captain
Death Line (1972) - Platform Inspector
Gawain and the Green Knight (1973) - Porter
Swallows and Amazons (1974) - Old Billy
Whatever Happened to the Likely Lads? (1974) - Joe Hargreaves

References

External links
 Jack Woolgar Official Website
 

1913 births
1978 deaths
English male television actors
People from Thames Ditton
20th-century British male actors